Lawrence Robert Carrière (born January 30, 1952) is a Canadian former professional ice hockey defenceman and executive.  He was drafted in the second round, 25th overall, by the Buffalo Sabres in the 1972 NHL Amateur Draft.  He played in the National Hockey League with the Sabres, Atlanta Flames, Vancouver Canucks, Los Angeles Kings, and Toronto Maple Leafs.

In his NHL career, Carrière appeared in 367 games. He scored 16 goals and added 74 assists.

After retiring as a player, Carrière spent 20 years with the Sabres as a scout and executive, and five with the Washington Capitals as a scout.

On July 16, 2010, Carrière joined the Montreal Canadiens as assistant general manager and director of player personnel. Carrière became an assistant coach with the Canadiens on December 17, 2011. In June 2017, Carrière was named general manager of the Laval Rocket while maintaining his assistant general manager duties for Marc Bergevin. He stepped down from the Rocket general manager role after one year, and was also replaced as Canadiens assistant general manager by director of player personnel Trevor Timmins. Carrière remained with the Canadiens as a senior advisor until the end of the 2019-20 season, after which his contract was not renewed.

Career statistics

Regular season and playoffs

References

External links

Carriere named Assistant-GM

1952 births
Living people
Atlanta Flames players
Buffalo Sabres draft picks
Buffalo Sabres executives
Buffalo Sabres players
Buffalo Sabres scouts
Canadian ice hockey defencemen
Cincinnati Swords players
Ice hockey people from Montreal
Los Angeles Kings players
Montreal Canadiens coaches
Montreal Canadiens executives
Springfield Indians players
Toronto Maple Leafs players
Tulsa Oilers (1964–1984) players
Vancouver Canucks players
Washington Capitals scouts
Canadian expatriate ice hockey players in the United States
Canadian ice hockey coaches